Edoardo Catto (23 September 1900 – 27 November 1963) was an Italian professional footballer who played as a striker.

He made his only appearance for the Italy national football team on 9 March 1924 in a game against Spain.

He is Genoa C.F.C.'s number one scorer in history with 92 goals in the Italian championship.
He won the Italian championship with the club in 1922–23 and 1923–24.

External links
 

1900 births
1963 deaths
Italian footballers
Italy international footballers
Genoa C.F.C. players

Association football forwards